Interflug Flight 1107 was a flight operated by East German airline Interflug from Stuttgart in West Germany to Leipzig in East Germany. On 1 September 1975 a Tupolev Tu-134 operating on the route crashed during its approach to Leipzig, killing 27 of the 34 passengers and crew on board.

Accident
The aircraft descended with guidance from air traffic control using a precision approach radar. Despite this the crew allowed the aircraft to descend too quickly and failed to check what was the decision height for Leipzig Airport. The Tu-134 struck a radio mast only two to three metres above its base and crashed. Three of the six crew and 24 of the 28 passengers were killed in the crash. The majority of the passengers were travelling to visit the Leipzig Trade Fair. The surviving crewmembers and the radar controller were all sentenced to prison terms as a result of the crash.

References

Accidents and incidents involving the Tupolev Tu-134
Aviation accidents and incidents in Germany
Airliner accidents and incidents involving controlled flight into terrain
Aviation accidents and incidents in 1975
1975 in East Germany
East Germany–West Germany relations
Interflug accidents and incidents
20th century in Saxony
September 1975 events in Europe